Maloye Sverchkovo is a rural locality (a village) in Permasskoye Rural Settlement, Nikolsky District, Vologda Oblast, Russia. The population was 10 as of 2002.

Geography 
Maloye Sverchkovo is located 45 km southeast of Nikolsk (the district's administrative centre) by road. Bolshoye Sverchkovo is the nearest rural locality.

References 

Rural localities in Nikolsky District, Vologda Oblast